Mick Jackson (born 4 October 1943) is an English film director and television producer best known for the 1984 BAFTA-winning TV film Threads.

Early life
Jackson was born on 4 October 1943 in the settlement of Aveley in Essex, England. He attended Palmer's School before graduating with a Bachelor of Arts in electronics at the University of Southampton and a postgraduate degree in drama from the University of Bristol.

Career
Between 1973 and 1987, he directed many documentary and drama productions for BBC TV and Channel 4, including the 1984 Cold War television film Threads. He also directed theatrical feature films, including L.A. Story (1991), Volcano (1997) and the Kevin Costner-Whitney Houston thriller The Bodyguard (1992).

Accolades
Jackson won an Emmy for Outstanding Directing for a Miniseries, Movie or a Dramatic Special for the biopic television film Temple Grandin.

He also won the Television Single Drama category for Threads at the 1985 BAFTA Awards.

Filmography

Film
 Chattahoochee (1989)
 L.A. Story (1991)
 The Bodyguard (1992)
 Clean Slate (1994)
 Volcano (1997)
 The First $20 Million Is Always the Hardest (2002)
 Denial (2016)

Television
 The Ascent of Man (1973)
 Connections (1978)
 Threads (1984)
 Yuri Nosenko: Double Agent (1986)
 Life Story (1987)
 A Very British Coup (1988)
 Indictment: The McMartin Trial (1995)
 Tuesdays with Morrie (1999)
 Live from Baghdad (2002)
 Covert One: The Hades Factor (2006)
 Temple Grandin (2010)

References

External links

 
 Threads on Kings of Horror's official YouTube channel
 Official trailer for Threads

Living people
1943 births
Alumni of the University of Bristol
Primetime Emmy Award winners
English film directors
English television directors
People from Aveley
People from Grays, Essex
English-language film directors
Directors Guild of America Award winners